The 2021 Challenger Concepción was a professional tennis tournament played on clay courts. It was the first edition of the tournament which was part of the 2021 ATP Challenger Tour. It took place in Concepción, Chile between 15 and 21 February 2021.

Singles main-draw entrants

Seeds

1 Rankings as of 8 February 2021.

Other entrants
The following players received wildcards into the singles main draw:
  Nicolás Álvarez
  Nicolás Jarry
  Gonzalo Lama

The following player received entry into the singles main draw as an alternate:
  Camilo Ugo Carabelli

The following players received entry from the qualifying draw:
  Hernán Casanova
  Carlos Gómez-Herrera
  Vitaliy Sachko
  Thiago Agustín Tirante

Champions

Singles

 Sebastián Báez def.  Francisco Cerúndolo 6–3, 6–7(5–7), 7–6(7–5).

Doubles

 Orlando Luz /  Rafael Matos def.  Sergio Galdós /  Diego Hidalgo 7–5, 6–4.

References

2021 ATP Challenger Tour
2021 in Chilean sport
February 2021 sports events in Chile